is a volcanic Japanese island in the Philippine Sea. It is part of the Izu archipelago and within the Fuji-Hakone-Izu National Park. Its only municipality is Hachijō. On 1 March 2018, its population was 7,522 people living on 63 km2. The Hachijō language is spoken by some inhabitants, but it is considered an endangered language and the number of speakers is unknown. The island has been inhabited since the Jōmon period, and was used as a place of exile during the Edo period. In modern times, it has been used for farming sugarcane and housing a secret submarine base during World War II; it is now a tourist destination within Japan.

The tallest peak within the Izu Islands, a Class-C active volcano, is found there. Transportation to the island is either by air or ferry. There are many Japanese-style inns, hot spring resorts, and hotels to accommodate tourists and visitors. The island is a popular destination for surfers, divers and hikers. It has several local variations on Japanese foods, including shimazushi and kusaya, as well as many dishes that include the local plant ashitaba.

Geography

Location
The island is within the boundaries of Fuji-Hakone-Izu National Park.

Municipalities
The only municipality on the island is the town of Hachijō, which encompasses both Hachijō-jima and the neighbouring Hachijō-kojima, though no one lives on the latter. The town is divided into five areas: Mitsune (三根), Nakanogo (中之郷), Kashitate (樫立), Sueyoshi (末吉), and Ōkago (大賀郷).

Population
The population of Hachijō-jima on 1 March 2018 was 7,522.

Language

The language spoken historically on Hachijō-jima is one of the most divergent forms of Japanese; it is the only surviving descendant of Eastern Old Japanese. The number of speakers is not certain; it is on UNESCO's list of endangered languages, and is likely to be extinct by 2050 if counter-measures are not taken.

Flora and fauna

The island is home to bioluminescent mushrooms, including Mycena lux-coeli—meaning "heavenly light mushrooms"—and Mycena chlorophos. M. lux-coeli are widely found and for decades were believed only to exist on the island. The local name for the mushrooms is hato-no-hi, literally "pigeon fire". Many different plants are native to the island, including the pygmy date palm, aloe, freesia, hydrangea, hibiscus, Oshima and Japanese cherry, and bird of paradise.

Since November 2015, humpback whales have been observed gathering around the island, far north from their known breeding areas in the Bonin Islands. All breeding activities except for giving births have been confirmed, and research is underway by the town of Hachijō and the Tokyo University of Marine Science and Technology to determine whether Hachijō-jima may become the northernmost breeding ground in the world, and possible expectations for opening a future tourism attraction. Whales can be viewed even from hot springs. Indo-Pacific bottlenose dolphins, likely (re)colonised from Mikura-jima, also live around the island, among other cetaceans such as false killer whales, sperm whales, and orcas (being sighted during humpback whale research in 2017).

The waters around the island are important for the nourishment of green sea turtles, as well as Hamatobiuo (a type of flying fish).

The Izu thrush makes its home on the island, as does the Japanese white-eye. The island has been recognised as an Important Bird Area (IBA) by BirdLife International because it also supports populations of Japanese wood pigeons, Japanese murrelets, Pleske's grasshopper warblers and Ijima's leaf-warblers.

Climate
Hachijō-jima has a humid subtropical climate (Köppen climate classification Cfa) with very warm summers and mild winters. Precipitation is abundant throughout the year, but is somewhat lower in winter.

Geology

It has eroded flanks and retains a distinctive caldera.

It is the highest point on the island and the tallest peak in the Izu island chain. It is rated as a Class-C active volcano by the Japan Meteorological Agency with recent eruptions recorded in 1487, 1518–1523, and 1605, with seismic activity as recently as 2002. Between these two peaks are over 20 flank volcanoes and pyroclastic cones.

History
Hachijō-jima has been inhabited since at least the Jōmon period, and archaeologists have found magatama and other remains. Under the Ritsuryō system of the early Nara period, the island was part of Suruga Province. It was transferred to Izu Province when Izu separated from Suruga in 680. During the Heian period, Minamoto no Tametomo was banished to Izu Ōshima after a failed rebellion, but per a semi-legendary story, escaped to Hachijō-jima, where he attempted to establish an independent kingdom.

During the Edo period, the island became known as a place of exile for convicts, most notably Ukita Hideie, a daimyō who was defeated at the Battle of Sekigahara. Originally the island was a place of exile mainly for political figures, but beginning in 1704 the criteria for banishment were broadened. Crimes punishable by banishment included murder, theft, arson, brawling, gambling, fraud, jailbreak, rape, and membership of an outlawed religious group. Criminals exiled to the island were never told the length of their sentences, and the history of the island is filled with foiled escape attempts. Its use as a prison island ended during the Meiji Restoration: after a general amnesty in 1868 most of the island's residents chose to move to the mainland; however, the policy of banishment was not officially abolished until 1881.

Former U.S. president Ulysses S. Grant visited the island during his 1877 world tour.  The island's residents were aware of his exploits in the American Civil War and gave him a jubilant welcome. He was ceremonially adopted by the village chief, being given the name ; meaning "courageous general" in the local dialect, and was presented with prayer beads made with pearls and gemstones. He declared that the island's residents were the "friendliest people in the Pacific".

In 1900, pioneers from Hachijō became the first inhabitants of the Daitō Islands, where they established a sugarcane farming industry. The Hachijō language is still spoken on the islands to this day.

During World War II, the island was regarded as a strategic point in the defense of the ocean approaches to Tokyo; and in the final stages of the war, a base of operations for the Kaiten suicide submarines was founded on the southern coast. From the end of the war through the 1960s, the government made attempts to promote Hachijō-jima as the "Hawaii of Japan" to encourage tourist development, and tourism remains a large component of the island's economy.

A historical mystery
There is a small mystery regarding the history of Hachijō-jima, of potential significance to the history of women's rights. Etsu Inagaki Sugimoto, a well known autobiographer from the early 20th Century states in A Daughter Of The Samurai that the island was commonly known in Japan during her childhood for being a place where standard gender roles were reversed; women did heavy field work and "made laws", and men tended the home and children. The mystery comes from the fact that no other current source mentions this today. A brief quote to illustrate the significance of the information:

" 'We have a whole island where women do men's work from planting rice to making laws.'What do the men do?''''Cook, keep house, take care of the children, and do the family washing.'You don't mean it!' exclaimed Miss Helen, and she sat down again.But I did mean it, and I told her of Hachijo, a little island about a hundred miles off the coast of Japan, where the women, tall, handsome, and straight, with their splendid hair coiled in an odd knot on the top of the head, and wearing long, loose gowns bound by a narrow sash tied in front, work in the rice fields, make oil from camellia seeds, spin and weave a peculiar yellow silk, which they carry in bundles on their heads over the mountains, at the same time driving tiny oxen, not much larger than dogs, also laden with rolls of silk to be sent to the mainland to be sold.  And in addition to all this, they make some of the best laws we have, and see that they are properly carried out. In the meantime, the older men of the community, with babies strapped to their backs, go on errands or stand on the street gossiping and swaying to a sing-song lullaby; and the younger ones wash sweet potatoes, cut vegetables, and cook dinner; or, in big aprons, and with sleeves looped back, splash, rub, and wring out clothes at the edge of a stream."  LCC Card No 66-15849, pp 202–203

 Transportation 
Hachijō-jima is accessible both by aircraft and by ferry. In 2010 a pedestrian ferry would leave Tōkyō once every day at 10:30 pm, and arrive at Hachijō-jima at 8:50 am the following day. Air travel to Hachijojima Airport takes 45 minutes from Tōkyō International Airport (Haneda). In 2000, there were three metropolitan roads on Hachijō-jima: 215 (formally, 東京都道215号八丈循環線),八丈島 II , Geospatial Information Authority of Japan. Retrieved 16 March 2018. 216 (都道216号神湊八重根港線, 8.3 km),再評価結果（平成１８年度事業継続箇所 一般都道神湊八重根港線（大  (PDF), Ministry of Land, Infrastructure, Transport and Tourism. Retrieved 16 March 2018. and 217 (東京都道217号汐間洞輪沢港線).

Tourism
Notable landmarks
The island is home to the Hachijo Royal Resort, a now-abandoned French baroque-style luxury hotel that was built during the tourism boom of the 1960s. When the hotel was built in 1963 it was one of the largest in Japan, and attracted visitors from all over the country. The hotel was finally closed in 2006 due to declining tourism to the island. As of April 2016, the grounds were overgrown and the building severely dilapidated.Anika Burgess, "Japan’s Abandoned Hotels Are Being Reclaimed by Nature ", Atlas Obscura, 6 September 2017. Retrieved 16 March 2018.

The  contains displays covering the history of the island, local industries, as well as the animals and plants found on and around the island. The  is a botanical and animal park next to the Hachijojima Visitors Center.

Activities and accommodation
In 2005, accommodation on Hachijō-jima was plentiful, with many Japanese-style inns, hot spring resorts, campsites, and several larger hotels. Hachijō-jima is popular with surfers, with three reef breaks and consistently warmer water than mainland Japan because of the Kuroshio Current. Because Hachijō-jima is a volcanic island, there are several black sandy beaches, including one next to the main harbour of Sokodo.

Hachijō-jima's scuba diving points were regarded in 2008 as many and varied, and as including one of the top five diving spots in Japan.

Hachijō-jima is known for its hiking trails, waterfalls, and natural environment. Other activities for visitors include visiting the Botanical Park, exploring wartime tunnels, and hiking to the top of Hachijō-fuji.Kihachijō, a naturally yellow silk fabric, is woven on the island. One of the workshops is open to tourists. The Tokyo Electric Power Company operates a free museum at its geothermal power plant.

Food

Hachijō-jima is famous both for its sushi—known locally as shimazushi—and for its kusaya (a dried and fermented version of hamatobiuo). As well as being served with sake, the latter is used in many different recipes.

Local cuisine also makes use of the ashitaba plant in dishes such as ashitaba soba and tempura.

Gallery

 See also 

 Runin: Banished, a 2004 film about convicts exiled to Hachijō-jima and their attempts to escape
 Battle Royale, a 2000 film filmed on the neighbouring, uninhabited, Hachijō Kojima, although not set on the island
 List of islands of Japan

References

Further reading
 Tsune Sugimura; Shigeo Kasai. Hachijo: Isle of Exile. New York: Weatherhill, 1973. 
 Teikoku's Complete Atlas of Japan''. Tokyo: Teikoku-Shoin, 1990.

External links

 Hachijojima – Japan Meteorological Agency 
 
 Hachijo Jima Volcano Group – Geological Survey of Japan
 

Izu Islands
Active volcanoes
Islands of Tokyo
Important Bird Areas of the Nanpo Islands
Seabird colonies